ABD is the Australian Broadcasting Corporation's television station in Darwin, Northern Territory. The station was the first to go to air in Darwin, on 13 August 1971. Its studios are located in the inner city of Darwin, with (now defunct) analog transmitter owned by the Nine Network on Blake Street in The Gardens and digital transmitter on Deloraine Road. The station is received throughout the territory through a number of relay transmitters, as well as by satellite on the Optus Aurora platform.

Programming
ABD follows a schedule similar to the ABC's statewide stations, opting out regularly for local news, current affairs, and sports programming.

ABC Darwin also produced its own edition of 7.30 until December 2014, when Quentin Dempster announced the final episode of the state editions would be the following week (Friday 5 December 2014), corresponding with his departure from the public broadcaster.

ABD previously aired live coverage of Northern Territory Football League matches every Saturday afternoon during the season. However, the ABC lost rights to SBS, which now broadcasts its coverage on NITV in the Northern Territory.

The station also broadcasts local Anzac Day services such as the local dawn service and march, as well as the Bombing of Darwin commemorations and NT General Election specials.

The analog signal for ABD was shut off at 9.00 am CST, Tuesday, 30 July 2013, along with NTD and other stations.

ABC News NT
ABC Darwin produces a local news bulletin nightly from the Cavenagh Street studios in Darwin City. The bulletin has a duration of 30 minutes on Monday to Saturday, and 40 minutes on Sunday. The bulletin contains coverage of local stories, national, international, and a Friday segment featuring ABC Radio Darwin's The Country Hour host Matt Brann - covering local events in the agricultural industry. The weeknight bulletins also incorporate a national finance segment, presented by Alan Kohler in Melbourne.

The bulletin is presented by Jessica Randell (every Sunday to Thursday) and Melissa Mackay (every Friday and Saturday).

ABC News NT is the only program produced by the network and is the only local news bulletin that is presented locally in Darwin (NTD produces its own Darwin news bulletin, but it is presented live from QTQ in Brisbane). However, they are known to contribute heavily to the daytime program Landline. The network previously produced programs Stateline and 7.30 NT, however, ABC axed the local production of these programs Australia wide.

Presenters 

 Jessica Randell (Sunday to Thursday)
 Melissa Mackay (Friday and Saturday)

Reporters 

 Dijana Aleksandrovic
 Mitchell Abram
 Jane Bardon
 Jano Gibson
 Melissa Mackay
 Kristy O'Brien
 Matt Garrick
 Lauren Roberts
 Jacqueline Breen
 Felicity James
 Henry Zwartz
 Kate Ashton
 Kathleen Ferguson
 Matt Brann
 Steve Vivian

Relay stations
The following stations relay ABD throughout the Northern Territory:

Notes:
1. HAAT estimated from http://www.itu.int/SRTM3/ using EHAAT.

See also
Television broadcasting in Australia

References

Television stations in Darwin, Northern Territory
Television channels and stations established in 1971
Television stations in Alice Springs
Australian Broadcasting Corporation television stations